Sa Ngalan ng Ama, Ina at mga Anak is a 2014 Philippine action film featuring the Padilla family. The film was on the shortlist to show at the 2013 Metro Manila Film Festival.

Synopsis
Set in the turbulent 1970s, the movie is about Ongkoy a former leader of the reputable anti-vigilante group Kuratong Baleleng. Regarded as the “Robinhood” of Ozamiz Mindanao, his strong views on family and patriotism remains to be the stuff of legend in Filipino culture up to the present times.

Cast

Robin Padilla as Octavio "Ongkoy" Parojinog
Daniel Padilla as Renato "Nato" Parojinog
Mariel Rodriguez-Padilla as Rosalinda "Indah" Parojinog
Kylie Padilla as Ka Anna
RJ Padilla as Ricardo "Ardot" Parojinog
Bela Padilla as Damian
Matt Padilla as Reynaldo "Aldong" Parojinog Sr.
Rommel Padilla as Old Nato
Gideon Padilla as Dagul
Queenie Padilla as Celia
Royette Padilla as Boyet Baliw

Special Participation
Christopher de Leon as Ka Romeo
Dina Bonnevie as Old Indah
Karla Estrada as Erning Wife
Pen Medina as Erning
Lito Pimentel as Major Calaang
Dennis Padilla as Wason
Bugoy Cariño as Young Ongkoy
Cha-Cha Cañete as Young Indah
Jao Mapa as Ongkoy's Assassin 1
Christian Vasquez as Ongkoy's Assassin 2
Minco Fabregas as Ongkoy's Assassin 3
Aljur Abrenica as Ka Dario/Baste
Ronnie Lazaro as Amadong Buwang
Sylvia Sanchez as Ka Julieta
Ketchup Eusebio as NPA Rebels
John Wayne Sace as Ka Jose Manalo
Joko Diaz as PNP Leader

References

2014 films
Filipino-language films
Philippine crime action films
Philippine crime drama films
Star Cinema films
Star Cinema drama films
Films about Filipino families
2014 crime drama films
2014 crime action films